Kenneth Flax (born April 20, 1963) is a retired American Olympic hammer thrower, whose personal best throw is 80.02 metres, achieved in May 1988 in Modesto.

Flax was born in San Francisco, California, and is Jewish. Flax is a two-time Olympic hammer thrower, who competed in the 1988 and 1992 Olympic Games. He competed in Track & Field as a student at Redwood High School, and began throwing the hammer for the University of Oregon in January 1982, and by June 1982 he won the USA Junior National Championships and competed in the Junior Pan Am Games in Caracas, Venezuela. Flax later went on to win two Pac-10 championships and the 1986 NCAA Championships, throwing seven personal records in nine throws and broke the NCAA record three times in the process which still stands today as the American Collegiate Record.

After college, Flax went on to compete in three World University Games winning a bronze and in 1991 he won the gold medal, beating the former number one ranked hammer thrower in the world, Heinz Weis. One of the highlights of Flax's throwing career was competing in the 1987 and 1991 World Championships, where he finished 7th in 1991 marking the first time in 21 years that an American has made the finals in the hammer throw in a non-boycotted major world event.

Flax won the gold medal in the hammer throw at both the 1985 Maccabiah Games, and then at the 1989 Maccabiah Games with a 78.86 meter toss.

In 2009, Ken was inducted into the Redwood High School Athletic Hall of Fame.  Flax was the best field man in Redwood's track history, a powerful young teen who hurled the shot 57 feet—second all-time best in the MCAL. He has also been inducted into the University of Oregon Athletic Hall of Fame.

Achievements

See also
List of Maccabiah records in athletics

References

External links

1963 births
Living people
American male hammer throwers
Athletes (track and field) at the 1988 Summer Olympics
Athletes (track and field) at the 1992 Summer Olympics
Olympic track and field athletes of the United States
Maccabiah Games medalists in athletics
Maccabiah Games gold medalists for the United States
Competitors at the 1985 Maccabiah Games
Competitors at the 1989 Maccabiah Games
Track and field athletes from San Francisco
Male weight throwers
World Athletics Championships athletes for the United States
Universiade medalists in athletics (track and field)
Jewish male athletes (track and field)
Oregon Ducks men's track and field athletes
Jewish American sportspeople
Universiade gold medalists for the United States
Universiade bronze medalists for the United States
Medalists at the 1989 Summer Universiade
Medalists at the 1991 Summer Universiade
Competitors at the 1986 Goodwill Games
21st-century American Jews
Redwood High School (Larkspur, California) alumni